= Rashnit =

Coordinates: 14°45′N 49°15′E

- Interactive map of Rashnit
- Country: Yemen
- Governorate: Hadhramaut
- Time zone: UTC+3 (Yemen Standard Time)

Rashnit is a village in eastern Yemen. It is located in the Hadhramaut Governorate.
